is a railway station on the Shinano Railway Kita-Shinano Line in Kashiwabara in the town of Shinano, Nagano, Japan, operated by the third-sector railway operator Shinano Railway.

Lines
Kurohime Station is served by the 37.3 km Shinano Railway Kita-Shinano Line and is 28.9 kilometers from the starting point of the line at Nagano Station.

Station layout
The station consists of one ground-level side platform and one island platform connected by a footbridge.

Platforms

Adjacent stations

History 
It was renamed Kurohime on 1 October 1968. With the privatization of Japanese National Railways (JNR) on 1 April 1987, the station came under the control of East Japan Railway Company (JR East).

From this date, Kurohime Station was transferred to the ownership of the third-sector operating company Shinano Railway.

Passenger statistics
In fiscal 2013, while still under the control of JR East, the station was used by an average of 389 passengers daily (boarding passengers only).

Surrounding area
Shinano Town Hall
Shinano Post Office

See also
List of railway stations in Japan

References

External links
  

Railway stations in Japan opened in 1888
Railway stations in Nagano Prefecture
Kita-Shinano Line
Shinano, Nagano